Ahmad Nourollahi (born 1 February 1993) is an Iranian professional footballer who plays as a midfielder for Shabab Al Ahli.

Club career

Early years
He was sixteen years old when he joined Foolad Yazd's Youth Academy. In 2011, he was promoted to the first team.

Foolad Yazd
After joining the first team of Foolad Yazd, Nourollahi played in the Azadegan League.

Persepolis

After three seasons at Foolad Yazd, he joined Persepolis in the summer of 2014, signing a three-year contract on 13 June. He made his debut in the 2014–15 Iran Pro League against Foolad. In the winter of 2017, Nourollahi went on loan to Tractor until the end of the season. He returned to Persepolis before the 2018–19 Persian Gulf Pro League.

Club career statistics

International career

Iran under-23
He was called up to the Iran under-23 team by Nelo Vingada in June 2014.

Senior team 

In October 2018 Nourollahi was called up to the Iran national football team training camp in Tehran by coach Carlos Queiroz.
He made his debut against Trinidad and Tobago on 15 November 2018.

International goals
Scores and results list Iran's goal tally first.

Honours
Persepolis
Persian Gulf Pro League (4): 2017–18, 2018–19, 2019–20, 2020–21
Hazfi Cup (1): 2018–19
Iranian Super Cup (3): 2018, 2019, 2020
AFC Champions League runner-up‌‌ (2): 2018, 2020

References

External links
 Ahmad Nourollahi at PersianLeague.com
 Ahmad Nourollahi at Ffiri.ir
 Ahmad Nourollahi at IranLeague.ir

1993 births
Living people
Iranian footballers
Iranian expatriate footballers
Foolad Yazd players
Persepolis F.C. players
Tractor S.C. players
Shabab Al-Ahli Club players
Persian Gulf Pro League players
UAE Pro League players
People from Golestan Province
Iran under-20 international footballers
Association football midfielders
2019 AFC Asian Cup players
Iran international footballers
Expatriate footballers in the United Arab Emirates
Iranian expatriate sportspeople in the United Arab Emirates
2022 FIFA World Cup players